Kevin Sullivan (born November 9, 1958) was the White House Communications Director, also known as the Assistant to the President for Communications, from July 24, 2006 until January 20, 2009. From April 2005 he was the Assistant Secretary for Communications and Outreach at the United States Department of Education.

Biography

Education
Sullivan was born in Evergreen Park, Illinois. He earned a bachelor of science in management from Purdue University and earned an MA in mass communication from Iona College, New Rochelle, New York. He serves as an advisor to The Global War on Terrorism Memorial Foundation.

Professional career
Before his role in the White House, Sullivan was assistant secretary for communications at the Department of Education. He had previously worked as a chief spokesperson and media relations executive at NBC Universal. He has a background in sports public relations for NBC and prior to that for the Dallas Mavericks of the National Basketball Association. Sullivan was recognized five times by the media as Outstanding Public Relations Director in the NBA's Western Conference and received the NBA's 2004 Splaver/McHugh Tribute to Excellence Award.

In January 2009, he was replaced by Ellen Moran when President Barack Obama took office.

Following his departure from the White House Sullivan founded Kevin Sullivan Communications, a
strategic communications consulting firm. He was a frequent guest co-host of "Polioptics," during the political communications show's run on SiriusXM's POTUS channel.

Publications
Breaking Through: Communications Lessons From the Locker Room, the Board Room & the Oval Office, digital book, 2015

Sources
 President Bush Appoints Kevin Sullivan as Assistant to the President for Communications, White House press release, 11 July 2006
 https://www.ksullivancommunications.com/our-team

References

External links
 Kevin Sullivan Communications

1958 births
American civil servants
Iona University alumni
Living people
People from Chicago
People from Evergreen Park, Illinois
American political commentators
Purdue University alumni
White House Communications Directors